Beyond the Wall of Sleep is a short story by H.P. Lovecraft.

Beyond the Wall of Sleep may also refer to:

 Beyond the Wall of Sleep (collection), a collection of writings by Lovecraft
 Beyond the Wall of Sleep (album), a 2014 album by Christian Muenzner
 "Beyond the Wall of Sleep", a song by Sentenced from the 1993 album North from Here

See also 
Behind the Wall of Sleep (disambiguation)
Beyond the Wall (disambiguation)